"Here We Are" is a song by Cuban-American singer-songwriter Gloria Estefan. It was released in 1989 in the United States and in 1990 to the rest of the world as the third single of her debut solo album, Cuts Both Ways (1989). It was released with the B-side song "Don't Let the Sun Catch You Crying", that was included on the European version, later to appear on the Hold Me, Thrill Me, Kiss Me album. A Portuguese version of the song, "Toda Pra Você," is included on the compilation Exitos De Gloria Estefan as well as the Brazilian edition of the Cuts Both Ways album. As a duet for her special television concert All The Way Concert, Celine Dion performed this song, while Estefan sang Dion's song, "Because You Loved Me". A new Spanish version called "Tu y yo" was released in July 2019 on Estefan's official YouTube channel, celebrating the 30th anniversary of the song. This version was also included on her 2020 album Brazil305.

Chart performance
"Here We Are" continued Estefan's success on the Billboard Hot 100 chart, becoming Estefan's ninth Top 10 single, peaking at number six in 1990. It also went to number one on the American adult contemporary chart and remained in the top spot for five weeks. Overseas, the song peaked at number 23 on the UK Singles Chart, number seven in Ireland and number 13 in the Netherlands.

Critical reception
Upon the release, Bill Coleman from Billboard remarked that the song's "beautifully etched acoustic guitar strumming frames Estefan's warm and inviting vocals". A reviewer from Entertainment Weekly felt it "croon along smoothly". British Lennox Herald described it as a "ballad of heartbreaking lament", where Estefan demonstrates her "glorious feel for a ballad." The reviewer concluded that the Carpenters "would have been proud of you". Ian McCann  from NME felt that Estefan "does her best Carpenters impression."

Retrospective response
In an 2019 retrospective review, Matthew Hocter from Albumism said "Here We Are" is the "epitome of what ‘80s ballads executed with pure perfection were all about". He named it a "highlight" of the Cuts Both Ways album. AllMusic editor Jason Birchmeier declared it as a "super" song. Maryann Scheufele from AXS featured it in her ranking of 10 Best Gloria Estefan Songs in 2014, calling it a "beautiful love song". She added that it "suggests how quickly time passes and love happens. Gloria Estefan has a powerful voice in this love song as she sings that there is "nothing I can do to keep from loving you" believably. Be reassured by love as you listen." In an 2016 review, Pop Rescue noted that acoustic guitars "gently strum in the background, and a scattering of piano help this song step back and let Gloria’s vocals shine."

Usage in media
"Here We Are" was used for the Cruz and Eden characters on the American soap opera Santa Barbara.  The song also appeared in an episode of the NBC daytime soap opera Another World in early 1990 as well as a 1990 episode of One Life to Live on ABC.

Charts

Weekly charts

Year-end charts

Track listings

Official versions
 Album Version — (4:49)
 Portuguese Version ("Toda Prá Você") — (4:49)
 English Version on Brazil305 — (4:40)
 Spanish Version on Brazil305 ("Tú Y Yo") — (4:40)

Release history

References

1989 songs
1989 singles
Gloria Estefan songs
Songs written by Gloria Estefan
Epic Records singles
Pop ballads
Song recordings produced by Emilio Estefan